Hermann Keimel (February 24, 1889 – October 15, 1948) was a German painter, graphic artist and commercial artist. He was born in Munich. His work was part of the painting event in the art competition at the 1932 Summer Olympics.

Works 
Keimel creates posters for:
 Deutschnationale Volkspartei, 1924
 Münchner Fasching, 1929
Perutz Film 1930, 
Winter in Bayern 1930, 
Die Wunder Bar 1930, 
Die Arche Noa (orientalisches Künstlerfest München) 1929 und 1930,
Plakatkunst München, 1931
Für Recht und Freiheit Bayerische Volkspartei, 1932
Deutsche Heeresskimeisterschaften Berchtesgaden, 1934
Deutsche kauft deutsche Ware, Deutsche Woche deutsche Ware deutsche Arbeit,1932  
Illustrationen zu Tiere aus Haus und Hof, Verlag Nürnberg A. Jaser, 1926
Münchner Fasching, 1929
24 Gebrauchsschriften : Für Werkstatt u. Schule, München Callwey Verlag, 1937

References

External links 

Kurzvita
Poster Example: where are you?
Poster Example: Carneval 1926 Cherubin Palace
Biography of Hermann Keimel

1889 births
1948 deaths
20th-century German painters
20th-century German male artists
German male painters
German graphic designers
Olympic competitors in art competitions